Mount Mahan is a mountain  high, standing  east of Mount Fiedler in the Bender Mountains of Antarctica. It was mapped by the United States Geological Survey from ground surveys and U.S. Navy air photos, 1960–63, and was named by the Advisory Committee on Antarctic Names for Shirley F. Mahan, a radioman with the Byrd Station winter party, 1960.

References

Mountains of Marie Byrd Land